Morgan King (born 28 March 1961) is an English songwriter, singer, Grammis award winning  record producer and photographer.

Musical career
Born in Spitalfields, London, King's musical career began in 1979 as drummer for Manchester band Illustration, who were subsequently signed by the indie label, "Some Bizzare" featuring on the Some Bizzare Album. After several years immersed in the UK indie scene, King's musical direction changed considerably with the advent of house music in the late 1980s. In 1988, King moved to Chicago and started writing with Kym Mazelle and Marshall Jefferson on Mazelle's first album, Crazy, which was released the following year. In 1989, King joined his third band, the Manic MCs who had a UK top thirty hit with their first release, "Mental".

In 1990, King started collaborating with BTech record's Jan Ekholm after being introduced by DJ/production duo Quartz, working in Sweden on a series of dance releases under various pseudonyms, including Technoir, Backbeat, Groovement, Bassrace and others.  "Clubland" originally formed by Dave Rawlings and Ronnie Herel of Quartz with Jan Ekholm. During the first album Quartz left and the two remaining members were joined by Zemya Hamilton on vocals. Clubland recorded three albums, winning a Swedish Grammy for their second album Adventures Beyond Clubland, plus received three gold discs.  Together they also topped the US Billboard Dance chart three times with "Lets Get Busy", "Hold On (Tighter to Love)" and "Hypnotized" respectively.  It was also during this period he recorded his solo record, the Balearic anthem "I Am Free".

In 1991, Kingn partnered with Nick Hook to form Om records in London and the band Soundsource, who subsequently achieved success with the House / rap track "Take Me Up", later recycled by "Lock 'N Load" for their 2000 top ten UK hit "Blow Ya Mind". This single was followed up by the 1992 club hit "One High". Again, King started writing and recording under a variety of pseudonyms at Om including, Al Hambra, VFN Experience, Om and Obiman.  Obiman went on to feature on the seminal Cafe Del Mar compilation series.  On the same album he also co-wrote and produced José Padilla's first solo recording "Agua".

Around 1994/1995, King took a break from the music scene, eventually resurfacing in 2003 to co-write Trybe's "Sarah Said" with Fragma. In 2007 he opened his Accidental Music label so he could make his archive available in the digital realm for the first time, and to collaborate on new dance projects. Also around the same time he became a professional photographer after he was invited to do a one off project in Iran. To date he is still working as an artist releasing solo albums and playing live, plus since 2012 he joined Lene Lovich as part of her band.

Selected discography

Morgan King 
Albums
Grains & Grams (2016), Accidental Music
Old Skin (2019), Accidental Music

Singles and EPs
"I'm Free" (1991), BTech Records
"I am Free" (1993), Om Records
"I'm Free" (1998), Excession Records
"I'm Free" (Anniversary Edition) (2011), Accidental Music
"I'm Free" (Anniversary Edition 2) (2012), Accidental Music
"Boy Called George" (2012), Morgan King Media
Zero (EP) (2012), Morgan King Media
"Breathing in Air" (2014), Accidental Music
"Grains & Grams" (2016), Accidental Music
"Alien" (2016), Accidental Music
"Sex Shop" (2018), Accidental Music
"Janet & John" (2018), Accidental Music
"From The Fade" (2021), Accidental Music
"Beautiful Miserable" (2021), Accidental Music

Morgan King & Lene Lovich 
Singles
"Retrospective" – 2018 Accidental Music

Morgan King / La Serrena 
Singles
"I'm Free" – 1992 Sony

With Clubland 
(King / Ekholm / Hamilton)
Albums
Themes From Outer Clubland – 1991
Adventures Beyond Clubland – 1992
Secrets of Inner Clubland (Clubland featuring Zemya Hamilton) – 1995

Selected singles
"Let's Get Busy (Pump It Up)" – 1990 US Hot Dance No. 1 UK No. 86
"Hold On (Tighter To Love)" – 1991 US Billboard "Hot Dance" No. 1, US No. 79
"(I'm Under) Love Strain" – 1992
"Come Rain Come Shine" – US Hot Dance No. 39 1992
"Hypnotized" – 1992 US Hot Dance No. 1
"Set Me Free" – 1992 US Hot Dance No. 1, US No. 90
"Peace of Luv" – 1995
"Gimme Love, Gimme All" – 1995

With Manic MC's 
(King / Cottle / Hudd)
Singles
"Mental" – 1989 RCA UK No. 30
"The Beat" – 1990 UK No. 96 MCA

With Soundsource 
(King / Hook)
Singles
"Take Me Up" – 1991 FFRR UK No. 62
"One High" – 1992 Om records

Obiman 
Singles
"Rising" – Om Records 1993
"On the Rocks" – Accidental Music 2016
"The Dunes" – Accidental Music 2016

Compilations
"On the Rocks" – Included on Cafe Del Mar Vol 1 album React Records 1994

With VFN Experience 
(Nasty / King)
Single
"Vol 1" – Om whites 1994

Morgan King & Max Julien 
Singles
"Lifetime of Understanding" – 2009 Deepsound Records
"Building A Dream" – 2011 Accidental Music

Morgan King vs Charma 
Singles
"Justify" – 2010 Accidental Music
"Justify" (Dirty Rhythm Syndicate Remixes) – 2011 Accidental Music

Morgan King vs Lyla D'Souza 
Singles
"I Want Now" – 2010 Accidental Music

Remixes 
Backbeat – "Love and Happiness" (Gasmatron mix) 1991
Clubland – "Ride the Groove" (With Billy Nasty) 1992
Clubland – "Hypnotized" (The Soundsource Seduction) 1992
Alhambra – "Sonar Remix" (with Nick Hook) 1992
MDA – "Take an E" (Roofon remix) (with Nasty / Hodgson) 1992
Hypernature – Flow "The Morgan King mixes" (King Full Force Effect, Kingdub and Kingdeep mixes)1992
Elimar – "Prosody II" (Morgan King Reprise) 2007
Sami Dee – "Da Fly" (Morgan King Remix) 2008
Max Julien feat Yohan Knight – "We're the Angels Alive!" (Morgan King Remix) 2008
Marco Zappala feat Claudio Pinhero – "Wherever You Go" (Morgan King Remix) 2009
Clubland – "Let's Get Busy" (Morgan King Remix) 2009

Compilation appearances 
Some Bizzare Album - 1981 (Illustration - Tidal Flow) Some Bizzare Records
Trance 3 – 1993 (Morgan King – I Am Free – Soma Mix) Rumour Records
Cafe Del Mar – Cafe Del Mar Vol 1 – 1994 (Obiman – "On the Rocks", Co-Written and produced Jose Padilla's "Agua") – React Records
Sound of the Absolute – 1994 (I Am Free – Soma Mix, Soundsource – One High – Bump Mix, Alhambra – Alhambra – Otama Mix, I Am Free – Leftfield Escape From Da Da Mix, Obiman – Rising – Rosi Ryder Mix, Om – Older Brother From the Rock)
Northern Exposure – Sasha and Digweed – 1996 (I'm Free – The Full Length La Serrena Mix and Playdo's Minimalist Mix) Ministry of Sound / Ultra Records
Renaissance Worldwide – Singapore 1997 I'm Free (William Orbit Mix) – Renaissance
Sasha – Global Underground #009: San Francisco" – 1998 (I'm Free – William Orbit Mix) Boxed
GU Mixed – 2007 Sound Source "One High" Global Underground
Snapshot (The Singles) – 2008 Accidental Music
Cafe Mambo – 2008 "I'm Free" compiled by Andy Cato, Defected Records
90's House – 2010 – Accidental Music
Cafe Del Mar Essentials – 2019 (Obiman – "On the Rocks").
The Tears of Technology - 2020 (Illustration - Tidal Flow) - Ace Records
Cafe Del Mar 40th Anniversary – 2020 (Morgan King – "I'm Free").

References

External links

Morgan King (Official Website)
Morgan King (Official YouTube Channel)

[ Clubland US Billboard chart positions] (from Allmusic)
Accidental Music (Morgan King's Electronic Music Label)

Illustration Website
Tracksource
Morgan King Photography
Lene Lovich
The Tears Of Technology

1961 births
Living people
English house musicians
English dance musicians
People from Spitalfields
English record producers
English songwriters